"Runcible" is a nonsense word invented by Edward Lear. The word appears (as an adjective) several times in his works, most famously as the "runcible spoon" used by the Owl and the Pussycat. The word "runcible" was apparently one of Lear's favourite inventions, appearing in several of his works in reference to a number of different objects. In his verse self-portrait, The Self-Portrait of the Laureate of Nonsense, it is noted that "he weareth a runcible hat". Other poems include mention of a "runcible cat", a "runcible goose" (in the sense of "silly person"), a "runcible wall", and "the Rural Runcible Raven".

Origin

Edward Lear's best-known poem, The Owl and the Pussy-Cat, published in 1870, includes the passage:

Another mention of this piece of cutlery appears in Edward Lear's alphabetical illustrations Twenty-Six Nonsense Rhymes and Pictures. Its entry for 'D' reads

Lear often illustrated his own poems, and he drew a picture of the "dolomphious duck" holding in its beak a round-bowled spoon containing a frog.

Alternative origins

Lear does not appear to have had any firm idea of what the word "runcible" means. His whimsical nonsense verse celebrates words primarily for their sound, and a specific definition is not needed to appreciate his work. However, since the 1920s (several decades after Lear's death), modern dictionaries have generally defined a "runcible spoon" as a fork with three broad curved tines and a sharpened edge, used with pickles or hors d'oeuvres, such as a pickle fork. It is used as a synonym for "spork". However, this definition is not consistent with Lear's drawing, in which it is a ladle, nor does it account for the other "runcible" objects in Lear's poems.

In other uses, a so-called runcible spoon is a fork shaped like a spoon, a spoon shaped fork, a grapefruit spoon (a spoon with serrated edges around the bowl), or a serving-spoon with a slotted bowl. Cutlery of this design (but not name) is evidenced as early as 1817.

Brewer's Dictionary of Phrase and Fable defines a runcible spoon as: "A horn spoon with a bowl at each end, one the size of a table-spoon and the other the size of a tea-spoon. There is a joint midway between the two bowls by which the bowls can be folded over." The Merriam-Webster dictionary defines it as "a sharp-edged fork with three broad curved prongs". Neither dictionary cites a source for these definitions.

The "Notes & Queries" column in The Guardian also raised the question "What is a runcible spoon?" The fanciful answers proposed by readers included that it was a variety of spoon designed by Lear's friend George Runcy for the use of infants, or that it was a reference to a butler named Robert Runcie whose job included polishing the silver spoons. The final contribution pointed out that neither of these explained the runcible cat in "The Pobble Who Has No Toes" and simply suggested that "runcible objects (spoons or cats) exist no more than pobbles or feline-hiboutic matrimony".

The Straight Dope, while treating "runcible" as a nonsense word with no particular meaning, claims that an unspecified 1920s source connected the word "runcible" etymologically to Roncevaux — the connection being that a runcible spoon's cutting edge resembles a sword such as was used in the Battle of Roncevaux Pass. The Straight Dope adds that "modern students of runciosity" link the word in a different way to Roncevaux: The obsolete adjective "rouncival" (an alternative spelling of rounceval), meaning "gigantic", also derives from Roncevaux, either by way of a certain large variety of pea grown there, or from a once-current find of gigantic fossilized bones in the region.

In popular culture
The whimsical feel of the word "runcible" has led to its appearance in diverse arenas.

 RUNCIBLE is also the name of a computer program compiler for an early (late 1950s) programming language. Donald Knuth published the flowchart of the compiler in 1959; this was his first academic paper.
 In the Pretty Things's psychedelic 1968 album, S.F. Sorrow, the song "Baron Saturday" features the lyrics: "'neath a sky of milk/You're drinking silk/You've lost the runcible spoon" in describing a part of the character's journey into his own subconscious mind. 
 Frabjoy & Runcible Spoon were a short-lived musical duo in the late 1960s consisting of Kevin Godley and Lol Creme. The pair were signed by Marmalade Records, and started work on an album with musicians Graham Gouldman and Eric Stewart before Marmalade shut down. The four musicians continued to collaborate and eventually evolved into the band 10cc.
 In Thomas Pynchon's 1973 Gravity's Rainbow, an exhibition fight with runcible spoons is held.
 In The Good Life (1975 TV series) episode Just My Bill, The Runcible Spoon is the name of a restaurant to which Tom Good, played by Richard Briers, attempts to sell his surplus produce.
 In The Deadly Assassin, a serial from the 14th season of the classic series of Doctor Who (1976), the reporter Runcible is one of the Doctor's old classmates from the Prydonian Academy, and the Doctor refers to him as "Runcible the Fatuous."
 Arthur C. Clarke's short story Playback makes the reference as the degrading psychic recording of a dead space pilot struggles to remember how to describe a human body with the line "The head, now. It is perfectly spherical, and weareth a runcible cap..."
 In Bloomington, Indiana, there is a restaurant called the Runcible Spoon, a local Bloomington staple and cultural landmark (1976).

 In Neal Stephenson's 1995 novel The Diamond Age, Runcible is a code name for the Young Lady's Illustrated Primer, an educational computer.
 In the 1996 board game Kill Doctor Lucky, a runcible spoon is one of the weapons players can use to kill Doctor Lucky.
 In Neal Asher's Polity series of novels, including Gridlinked (2001), runcible is the name given to an interstellar wormhole generator/teleporter, as an homage to the ansible. The central field for these devices is also known as the runcible's spoon.
 Paul McCartney's 2001 album Driving Rain includes the track "Heather" which features the lyrics: "And I will dance to a runcible tune / With the queen of my heart". McCartney has explained the connection to "The Owl and the Pussycat" in various interviews since its release.
 In Lemony Snicket's 2006 The End, an island cult eats using only runcible spoons.
 In the webcomic Questionable Content, J. Edward Runcible (an amalgamation of "Edward Lear" and "Runcible") is the name of a 19th-century conspiracy theorist (2007).
 In the webcomic Girl Genius, Gilgamesh Wulfenbach uses a "hand-cranked runcible gun" that shoots sporks during a staged fight (2008).
 The Runcible Spoon is a food magazine published in the District of Columbia. It was founded in 2010.
 Runcible was a smartphone pocket watch under development in 2016 by Monohm Inc.
 In the webcomic Dominic Deegan, Runcible Spoon is a professor and staff member at the School of Arcane Arts, in particular, the Arcane Elemental Research Department. He loves hearing "CURSE YOU RUNCIBLE SPOON!!!" from an elemental that he launches fireballs at.
 The first "higgledy hero" companion that players can acquire in the 2018 PlayStation 4 videogame Ni no Kuni II: Revenant Kingdom is named "Runcible the Righteous".
 Runcible is the name of a stuffed bear in Wil Wheaton's RPG Titansgrave. The bear guides players through the fictional Reed Manor.
Runcible is the name of the spaceship Wallfish's ship's pig in Christopher Paolini's To Sleep in a Sea of Stars.
 Agatha Runcible is the name of a character in Evelyn Waugh's 1930 novel Vile Bodies.

References

Words originating in fiction
Nonce words
Spoons